"Chillin' Like a Villain" is a song from Disney Channel's 2017 television film Descendants 2, whose music and lyrics were composed by Antonina Armato, Tim James, Tom Sturges and Adam Schmalholz. The song was performed in the film by the cast –  Sofia Carson, Cameron Boyce, Booboo Stewart and Mitchell Hope– in their vocal roles as Evie (daughter of The Evil Queen), Carlos (son of Cruella de Vil), Jay (son of Jafar) and Ben (son of Belle and Beast). The song peaked at number 95 on the Billboard Hot 100.

Charts

Certifications

Christmas version

"Chillin' Like a Snowman" is a song performed by Sofia Carson. It was released on December 1, 2017 by Walt Disney Records. The song is the holiday version of "Chillin' Like a Villain" from Disney Channel's Descendants 2.

Track listing
 Digital download
 "Chillin' Like a Snowman" — 2:29

Release history

References

Songs written by Tom Sturges
Songs written by Antonina Armato
Songs written by Tim James (musician)
2017 songs
Song recordings produced by Rock Mafia
Songs from Descendants (franchise)
Songs written by IN-Q
American Christmas songs
Nu-disco songs
Sofia Carson songs